James Vincent Chataway (6 September 1852 – 12 April 1901) was a member of the Queensland Legislative Assembly.

Biography
Chataway was born in Warwickshire, England, the son of James Chataway and his wife Elizabeth (née Drinkwater) and was educated at Winchester College. He was at first destined for the Indian civil service but after a period of ill-health this was abandoned and he instead headed to Australia, arriving in 1873.

After his arrival he was in Victoria and New South Wales getting pastoral experience before arriving in Queensland where he worked as an auctioneer and owned a livery stable. He then took up an interest in Eton Plantation in the Mackay region before taking up the role as editor of the Mackay Mercury in 1883 and three years later owner of the newspaper. In 1892 he established the Mackay Sugar Journal and Tropical Cultivator.

On 8 December 1882 Chataway married Jessie Carlyle Little and together had two sons and two daughters. He died in April 1901 and was buried in the Church of England Cemetery, Ormiston (now known as the Cleveland Cemetery).

Public career
Chataway, representing the Ministerialists, became the junior member in the 2 member electorate of Mackay at the 1893 Queensland colonial election. He represented Mackay until his death in 1901. During his time in parliament he held the following ministerial portfolios:
 Minister without Office 25 February 1898 to 2 March 1898
 Secretary for Agriculture 2 March 1898 to 12 October 1898 
 Secretary for Public Lands and Agriculture 12 October 1898 to 1 December 1899 
 Secretary for Public Lands and Agriculture 7 December 1899 to 12 April 1901

Street name
A number of street names in the Brisbane suburb of Carina Heights are identical to the surnames of former Members of the Queensland Legislative Assembly. One of these is Chataway Street.

References

Members of the Queensland Legislative Assembly
1852 births
1901 deaths
19th-century Australian politicians